Doss (born 1990) is an American singer, songwriter, record producer, and DJ from New York City.

Career
Doss began releasing music under her stage name in 2012 with a remix of the song "& It Was U" by How to Dress Well, as well as a remix of Wildarms' "Full Hearts" in 2013. After signing to Acéphale Records in 2014, Doss released her eponymous debut EP, which received critical acclaim among online music publications. The single release of "The Way I Feel" from the EP featured four new remixes from Recycle Culture, Ana Caprix, and PC Music act Life Sim.

Doss took a hiatus from releasing original music until 2021, returning with the song "Puppy" as the lead single of her second EP 4 New Hit Songs. The EP landed on numerous "Beat Of" end of the year lists. Doss also contributed to Lady Gaga's third remix album Dawn of Chromatica with a remix of "Enigma". In November 2021, she released a Spotify-exclusive song titled "Cherry" with vocal contributions from Cecilia Gault.

In 2022, Doss released a new song titled "Jumpin". In October of the same year, she released an accompanying remix EP to 4 New Hit Songs, featuring contributions from Rye Rye, Hudson Mohawke, and Plush.

Discography

Extended plays

Singles

Remixes

References

21st-century American women singers
21st-century American singers
21st-century LGBT people
21st-century women musicians
American women DJs
American women in electronic music
American trance musicians
Club DJs
Electro house musicians
LGBT people from New York (state)
American LGBT singers
American LGBT songwriters
Living people
Record producers from New York (state)
Remixers
Women in electronic music
Year of birth missing (living people)